Per Wilhelm Noréen (born 6 November 1965) is a Swedish curler and curling coach.

He is a three-time World Mixed Doubles Championship silver medallist.

In 2006 he was inducted into the Swedish Curling Hall of Fame.

Teams

Men's

Mixed

Mixed doubles

Record as a coach of national teams

Personal life
His wife and teammate is a curler Camilla Noréen (née Johansson).

References

External links
 
 Curling World Cup 2018-19 profile (web-archive)
 
 Mixed Dubbel - Svenska Curlingförbundet 
 Camilla Noreen/Per Noreen (SWE) wins Latvian Mixed Doubles Curling Cup 1! | LMDCC

Living people
1965 births
People from Gävle
Swedish male curlers
Swedish curling champions
Swedish curling coaches
21st-century Swedish people